Kern's Beverages, commonly known as Kern's, is a beverage company based in Santa Ana, California, but often the drinks are manufactured in Mexico. The company is a subsidiary of the Mexican drink company Jumex.

Their main product line is Kern's Nectar, a non-carbonated, sweetened fruit nectar drink, which uses fruit puree as the primary flavoring agent. Kern's Nectar is sold in a variety of containers and is made in Mexico, with many flavors featuring tropical fruits. They also produce Mexican beverages like agua frescas and horchata.

History
The company was started in 1889 and grew in the 1920s, being incorporated in 1932. The company was acquired by Nestlé in 1985. In 2004, Kern's was sold to a group of investors led by Stremicks Heritage Foods. In 2013, Kern's was acquired by Jumex.

References

External links
Kern's website
Stremick's Heritage Foods website

Companies based in Santa Ana, California
Drink companies based in California
1920s establishments in California